Gale Ridge is a ridge,  long, extending northwestward from Mount Dover in the Neptune Range of the Pensacola Mountains, Antarctica. It was mapped by the United States Geological Survey from surveys and U.S. Navy air photos, 1956–66, and was named by the Advisory Committee on Antarctic Names for Phillip L. Gale, a meteorologist at Ellsworth Station, winter 1962.

References

Ridges of Queen Elizabeth Land